"Forever Love" is a song performed by Color Me Badd. The song was written and produced by the group along with Jimmy Jam and Terry Lewis, and it appears on the soundtrack to the film Mo' Money. The song was released on November 24, 1992 as the soundtrack's seventh and final single by Perspective Records. It is also included on the group's remix album Young, Gifted & Badd. The song peaked at number 15 on the Billboard Hot 100 in 1992. It was their final top 20 single on the Hot 100.

Music video

The official music video for the song was directed by Marcus Nispel., who also directed the video for "Thinkin' Back". Like the latter, the video is also filmed in black and white.

Critical reception

Larry Flick from Billboard wrote, "This tender -hearted pop ballad, laced with lush harmonies and soft percussion, should net high marks at adult -leaning top 40, urban, and AC outlets. Easy -listening, melodic fare is tailor -made for quartet's increasingly ardent audience.

Charts

References

External links
 

1990s ballads
1992 singles
1992 songs
Color Me Badd songs
Contemporary R&B ballads
Giant Records (Warner) singles
Music videos directed by Marcus Nispel
Perspective Records singles
Pop ballads
Song recordings produced by Jimmy Jam and Terry Lewis
Song recordings produced by Sam Watters
Songs written by Jimmy Jam and Terry Lewis
Songs written by Sam Watters
Soul ballads